Love in 3-D (German: Liebe in drei Dimensionen) is a 1973 German adult comedy film directed by Walter Boos. The story features Petra (Ingrid Steeger), a naive 17 year old girl, who rents her sister Dagmar's apartment in Munich, and the sexual escapades of the other residents of the apartment block.

The film was dubbed into English for American audiences. As compared to other mid-1970s adult films that were shot in 3-D, Love in 3-D stands out for several reasons. It was shot on 70 mm, very unusual for a low budget adult film. The movie itself contains several notable 3-D scenes as everything from oranges, water, tree branches, swings, and breasts are thrust out toward the audience. One standout (non-adult) sequence involves a spider during a ride in an old ghost house.

Cast
Ingrid Steeger - Petra
Evelyn Raess - Dagmar
Christina Lindberg - Inge
Achim Neumann - Manfred
Dorit Henke  - Anita
Nico Wolferstetter - Udo
Dorothea Rau - Fanny
Rinaldo Talamonti - Enrico
Elisabeth Volkmann - Rosi
Ulrike Butz - Lissy
Konstantin Wecker - Rudi
Rosl Mayr - Frau Huber

External links

1973 films
1970s sex comedy films
1970s 3D films
German sex comedy films
German 3D films
West German films
1970s German-language films
Films directed by Walter Boos
Films set in Munich
1973 comedy films
Dimension Pictures films
1970s German films